Aristelliger lar, also known as the Hispaniolan giant gecko and the spotted Caribbean gecko, is a species of lizard in the family Sphaerodactylidae. The species is endemic to the island of Hispaniola.

Etymology
The specific name, lar, refers to a Lar, an ancient Roman household god.

Geographic range
A. lar is found in disjunct populations on Hispaniola, in both the Dominican Republic and Haiti.

Description

Reproduction
A. lar is oviparous.

References

Further reading
Cope ED (1862). "On the Genera Panolopus, Centropyx, Aristelliger and Sphærodactylus ". Proceedings of the Academy of Natural Sciences of Philadelphia 13: 494–500. (Aristelliger lar, new species, p. 497).
Schwartz A, Henderson RW (1991). Amphibians and Reptiles of the West Indies: Descriptions, Distributions, and Natural History. Gainesville, Florida: University of Florida Press. 720 pp. . (Aristelliger lar, p. 363).

lar
Reptiles described in 1861
Lizards of the Caribbean
Reptiles of the Dominican Republic
Reptiles of Haiti
Endemic fauna of Hispaniola